de Soules (de Soulis) is the surname of an old Norman noble family originating from Soulles, also known as the House of de Soules.

The family was also linked to the Scottish Crown through the marriage of William I de Soules and Ermengarde, daughter of Alan Durward by Marjorie, illegitimate daughter of Alexander II of Scotland. Their son, Nicholas II de Soules, was one of the competitors for the Crown of Scotland, upon the death of  Margaret, Maid of Norway in 1290.

Castles
Liddel Castle
Hermitage Castle
Kilmarnock Castle

Notes

References
Coventry, Martin. (2010) Castles of the Clans Scotland: Goblinshead 
McAndrew, Bruce A. Scotland's Historic Heraldry, Boydell Press, 2006. 
McMichael, Thomas. The Feudal Family of de Soules. Transactions and Journal of Proceedings of the Dumfriesshire and Galloway Natural History & Antiquarian Society. Dumfriesshire and Galloway Natural History and Antiquarian Society, 1947–1948. Third series, Vol. 26.

Medieval English families
Scottish monarchy
Anglo-Norman families
Scottish families